Almirante Antequera (AA) was a 2nd series  that fought on the Republican side during the Spanish Civil War and, after the war, joined the post-war Spanish Navy. She was named after Juan Bautista Antequera y Bobadilla, a vice admiral and Spanish Minister of the Navy.

Spanish Civil War 
At the start of the conflict, Almirante Antequera was in Santander. She sailed to Málaga on 19 July 1936, arriving on 21 July. After a patrol mission, some of her officers who sided with the rebels turned themselves in to the Republican authorities. During the war, she patrolled the area around the Strait of Gibraltar. She also participated in the landings at Ibiza and in the failed Invasion of Majorca, as well as in the Battle of Cape Cherchell, while under the command of Captain Alberto Bayo. 

She also took part in the Battle of Cape Palos, firing five torpedoes at the enemy cruisers and contributing to the sinking of the Nationalist heavy cruiser .

On 5 March 1939, she left Cartagena along with most of the Republican fleet following the uprising in the city, reaching Bizerta on 11 March. The next day, the crews solicited political asylum in Tunisia. Most of the ship's crews were interned, with a few Spaniards left to guard the ships. The rest were transported to a concentration camp in Meheri Zabbens.

After the Civil War 
On 2 April 1939, merely 24 hours after the war concluded, Almirante Antequera and the other ships that left Cartagena sailed to Cádiz, arriving in the last hours of 5 April. She was scrapped on 8 October 1965.

References 

 
Ships built in Cartagena, Spain
1930 ships